The 1998 UC Davis football team represented the University of California, Davis as an independent during the 1998 NCAA Division II football season. Led by sixth-year head coach Bob Biggs, UC Davis compiled an overall record of 10–2. 1998 was the 29th consecutive winning season for the Aggies. UC Davis was ranked No. 4 in the NCAA Division II poll at the end of the regular season and, for the third straight season, advanced to the NCAA Division II Football Championship playoffs, where they were upset in the first round my 11th-ranked . Aggies had beaten the Javelinas in the first round of the playoffs the previous two seasons. The team outscored its opponents 398 to 259 for the season. The Aggies played home games at Toomey Field in Davis, California.

Schedule

NFL Draft
The following UC Davis Aggies players were selected in the 1999 NFL Draft.

References

UC Davis
UC Davis Aggies football seasons
UC Davis Aggies football